Light Ek Kalokh is a 2015 Marathi film directed & produced by Deepak K. Bajaj. The film featuresSmita Tambe,Smita Gondkar, Vijay Gite, Ritika Shrotri and Sandesh Jadhav as main characters. The music was composed and produced by Mohit Manuja and features singers Swapnil Bandodkar and Bela Shende.

References

2010s Marathi-language films